Miconia ayacuchensis is a species of plant in the family Melastomataceae. It is endemic to Peru.

References

Endemic flora of Peru
ayacuchensis
Vulnerable plants
Taxonomy articles created by Polbot